The Foreign Secretary is the most senior diplomat and governmental, non-political official in the Ministry of Foreign Affairs (MOFA) of the Government of Bangladesh.

The holder of the post heads all functions of their ministry, including the Foreign Service (also called Diplomatic Service) and reports to the Foreign Minister, who is the most senior political figure with responsibilities for Foreign Affairs.

The current Foreign Secretary is Mr.Masud Bin Momen. The first Foreign Secretary was Abul Fateh.

List of foreign secretary

References

External links
  Ministry of Foreign Affairs official website
 Rules of Business of Ministry of Foreign Affairs
 List of former Foreign Secretaries of Bangladesh